Two fencers and one rugby player of Haitian nationality competed at the 1900 Summer Olympics in Paris for Haiti. It would not be until the 1924 Summer Olympics until the nation sent a team to compete at the Olympic Games.

Fencing

Neither Haitian fencer advanced past the first round.

Rugby

Constantin Henriquez took part in a Rugby tournament as part of a Mixed team and won a  medal with this team.

References

Nations at the 1900 Summer Olympics
1900
Olympics